Alicia Wiencek Fiene (1918-1961) was an American painter. She is best known for her New Deal era mural in the Mooresville, North Carolina Post Office.

Biography
Fiene née Wiencek was born on April 23, 1918, in Chicopee, Massachusetts. She studied at the Art Students League of New York and the Colorado Springs Fine Arts Center. In 1945 she married her professor Ernest Fiene with whom she had two children. Prior to their marriage the couple worked together on Fiene's fresco murals for the Central High School of Needle Trades.

In 1937 Wiencek painted the mural North Carolina Cotton Industry for the Mooresville, North Carolina Post Office. The mural was funded by the Treasury Section of Fine Arts (TSFA). Wiencek's work is in the collection of the Detroit Institute of Arts.

She died in New York City on February 17, 1961.

References

1918 births
1961 deaths
People from Massachusetts
American women painters
20th-century American painters
American muralists
20th-century American women artists
Women muralists